Estrid Bjørnsdotter also called Estrid Byrdasvend (12th century) was a Norwegian Queen consort, spouse of King Magnus V of Norway.

Estrid Bjørnsdotter was the daughter of Björn Byrdasvend and Rangrid Guttormsdotter, who was a possible descendant of Tostig Godwinson, the brother of the last Anglo-Saxon King of England Harold Godwinson. She was the widow of Tore Skinnfeld. She later married King Magnus V in the year of 1170, and thereby became queen of Norway.

References

Other sources
 Jirí Louda and Michael MacLagan, Lines of Succession: Heraldry of the Royal Families of Europe, 2nd edition (London, U.K.: Little, Brown and Company, 1999), table 24.

External links 
 http://www.geneall.net/W/per_page.php?id=17439
 http://thepeerage.com/p11301.htm#i113008

Titles
	

Norwegian royal consorts
Year of birth unknown
Year of death unknown
Place of birth unknown
Place of death unknown
12th-century Norwegian women
12th-century Norwegian people